Erwin House is a historic home located in Tippecanoe Township, Marshall County, Indiana.  It was built about 1855, and is a two-story, upright, Greek Revival style frame dwelling with -story flanking wings.  It sits on a granite fieldstone foundation and is sheathed in clapboard siding.  It features a front porch with gable roof.

It was listed on the National Register of Historic Places in 2016.

References

Houses on the National Register of Historic Places in Indiana
Greek Revival houses in Indiana
Houses completed in 1879
Buildings and structures in Marshall County, Indiana
National Register of Historic Places in Marshall County, Indiana